, also known as  or then , was a Japanese domain of the Edo period. It was associated with Buzen Province in modern-day Fukuoka Prefecture on the island of Kyushu.

In the han system, Kokura was a political and economic abstraction based on periodic cadastral surveys and projected agricultural yields.  In other words, the domain was defined in terms of kokudaka, not land area. This was different from the feudalism of the West.

List of daimyōs 
The hereditary daimyōs were head of the clan and head of the domain.

  Hosokawa clan, 1600–1632 (tozama; 399,000 koku)

Tadaoki
Tadatoshi

  Ogasawara clan, 1632–1871 (fudai; 150,000 koku)

Tadazane
Tadataka
Tadamoto
Tadafusa
Tadamitsu
Tadakata
Tadaakira
Tadahiro
Tadatoshi
Tadanobu

See also 
 List of Han
 Abolition of the han system

References

External links
 Kokura on "Edo 300 HTML" (9 Oct. 2007)

Domains of Japan
Ogasawara clan
Ōshū-Hosokawa clan